The Western Front  was an army group in the armed forces of the Russian Empire during the First World War. It was established in August 1915 when the Northwestern Front was split into the Northern Front and Western Front, and was disbanded in 1918. From the time of its formation until the final year of its existence, the Western Front's field headquarters was in Smolensk, but it was later moved to Minsk.

Composition
 Field Headquarters
 1st Army (August 1915 - April 1916)
 2nd Army (August 1915 - the beginning of 1918)
 3rd Army (August 1915 - June 1916, July 1916 - early 1918)
 4th Army (August 1915 - October 1916)
 10th Army (August 1915 - the beginning of 1918)
 Special Army (August - September 1916, November 1916 - July 1917)

Commander of the armies of the Western Front
 04.08.1915 — 18.08.1915 — Mikhail Alekseyev
 23.08.1915 — 11.03.1917 — Alexei Evert
 11.03.1917 — 31.03.1917 — Vladimir Smirnov
 31.03.1917 — 23.05.1917 — Vasily Gurko
 31.05.1917 — 30.07.1917 — Anton Denikin
 31.07.1917 — 05.08.1917 — Pyotr Lomnovsky
 05.08.1917 — 12.11.1917 — Pyotr Baluyev
 12.11.1917 — 11.1917 — Vasily Kamenshchikov 
 11.1917 — 1918 — Alexander Miasnikian

References

See also
 List of Imperial Russian Army formations and units
 Western Front electoral district (Russian Constituent Assembly election, 1917)

Fronts of the Russian Empire
Military units and formations established in 1915
1915 establishments in the Russian Empire